The Scorpion King (released in Hong Kong as Operation Scorpio) (Chinese: 羯子戰士) is a 1992 Hong Kong martial arts film directed by David Lai, and starring Chin Kar-lok, Lau Kar-leung and Kim Won-jin. The film was released on 12 November 1992.

Plot
Budding comic book artist Yuk Su (Chin Kar-Lok) finds himself living out the fantasies of his alternate world when he saves a young girl from an illegal prostitution racket. After he was expelled from medical school his father took Yuk Su to one of his father's friends to help him keep up with his education. Soon he found a teacher (Lau Kar Leung) who can help him live on his dreams and be a legendary hero. With the aid of his fecund imagination and the help of an aging kung fu expert Yuk Su becomes something even he had never dared dream, a hero in real life.

Cast
 Chin Kar-lok as Yuk Su / Yu Shu
 Lau Kar-leung as Master Yat / Master Lo
 May Lo as Jade
 Kim Won-jin as Sonny Wang
 Fung Woo as Uncle Chai
 Victor Hon as Mr. Wang
 Frankie Chin as Bull / Jean Pal
 Steven Yuen as Inspector Hua
 Tiffany Lau as Lan
 Lawrence Lau as Fatty Hsing
 Yuen Miu as Tallie
 Sai Gwa-pau as Waiter
 Wang Han-Chen as Uncle Jung
 James Lai as Inspector Hua's son
 Fung Yuen-chi as Loanshark in Su's dream
 Yuen Tak as Hua's Henchman
 Thomas Sin as Tien

Release
Fox released the DVD in the US on May 25, 2004.

Reception
J. Doyle Wallis of DVD Talk rated it 3/5 stars and wrote, "Extremely mediocre story is elevated by the action talent on hand, mainly Kim Won-jun, whose jaw dropping skills make the film worth owning for any martial fan."  The Encyclopedia of Martial Arts Movies rated it 3.5/4 stars and wrote of the climax, "Although slightly marred by wire special effects, the bulk of the battle is breathtaking martial arts – perhaps some of the best ever filmed, and certainly the best of the year."

Styles
Taekwondo-A Korean martial art which focuses almost exclusively on kicks, Taekwondo was utilized by Sonny Wang and incorporated into his own signature style (kung fu that resembles a scorpion).

Boxing-A basic sport that uses:
1. Jab
2. Cross
3. Hook
4. Uppercut
This fighting style was used by Bull/Jean Paul in a fight against Sonny Wang following the attempted abduction of his father.

References

External links
 

1992 films
1992 martial arts films
Hong Kong martial arts comedy films
1990s Cantonese-language films
Police detective films
Golden Harvest films
Films set in Hong Kong
Films shot in Hong Kong
Films directed by David Lai
1990s Hong Kong films